The 2006 Princeton Tigers football team represented Princeton University in the 2006 NCAA Division I FCS football season. The team was coached by Roger Hughes and played their home games at Princeton Stadium in Princeton, New Jersey. Princeton shared the Ivy League championship. The 2006 season was Princeton's first nine-win season since the 1964 season.

Schedule

References

Princeton
Princeton Tigers football seasons
Ivy League football champion seasons
Princeton Tigers football